The 19th Sarawak State Legislative Assembly is the present term of the Sarawak State Legislative Assembly, the legislative branch of the Government of Sarawak in Sarawak, Malaysia. The 19th Assembly is consisted of 82 members that were elected in the 2021 Sarawak state election. The term will last for five years in maximum from the first sitting.

Officeholders

Speakership 
 Speaker: Mohamad Asfia Awang Nassar
 Deputy Speaker: Idris Buang

Other parliamentary officers 
 Secretary: Pele Peter Tinggom 
 Deputy Secretary: Abang Mohammad Adib Abang Sallehadin
 Serjeants-at-Arms:

Party leaders 
 Premier: Abang Abdul Rahman Johari Abang Openg (GPS-PBB)
 Deputy Premier: Sim Kui Hian (GPS-SUPP), Douglas Uggah Embas (GPS-PBB), Awang Tengah Ali Hasan (GPS-PBB)
 Leader of the Opposition: Wong Soon Koh (PSB)

Floor leaders 
 Leader of the House: 
 Shadow Leader of the House:

Whips 
 Government Whip:
 Opposition Whip:

Composition

Members

List

Committees 
The following members of committees has been appointed as of 16 February 2022.

Committee of Selection and Standing Orders

Public Accounts Committee

House Committee

Public Petitions Committee

Committee of Privileges

Dewan Negeri Event Committee

Seating plan

Notes

References 

Sarawak State Legislative Assembly